Ashworth Brothers Mill is an historic mill complex located on Globe Mills Avenue in Fall River, Massachusetts. The mill was constructed for the manufacture of textile carding machinery. The site was determined eligible for the National Historic Register in 1983, but omitted due to owner's objection.

See also
National Register of Historic Places listings in Fall River, Massachusetts
List of mills in Fall River, Massachusetts

References

Industrial buildings and structures on the National Register of Historic Places in Massachusetts
Textile mills in Fall River, Massachusetts
National Register of Historic Places in Fall River, Massachusetts